Canal Street Brewing Co., L.L.C., doing business as Founders Brewing Company, is a brewery in Grand Rapids, Michigan, known for producing several highly rated and award-winning craft-style ales, including KBS (Kentucky Breakfast Stout), Centennial IPA, Dirty Bastard, and Founders Porter. Since its founding as a craft brewery in the mid-1990s, it has grown to become the 15th largest brewery in the United States, and a prominent member of the West Michigan brewing industry. It is now majority-owned by Mahou San Miguel of Spain.

History

Mike Stevens and Dave Engbers were homebrewing enthusiasts who had recently graduated from college. The company was originally organized in 1996 as John Pannell Brewing Company; Stevens and Engbers changed the company's name to Canal Street Brewing Co. in 1997. They took that name from the historical name of the Grand Rapids street (now Monroe Avenue) where they had set up operations, in an area where several 19th-century breweries once stood. The label for their Founders Pale Ale featured a historical image of brewers from that era with the word "Founders" above it; customers took that to be the name of the company, so Engbers and Stevens adopted it for general use.

In the 2000s, following its move to a larger facility on Grandville Avenue (now César E. Chávez Avenue), Founders became one of the most prominent breweries in Michigan, expanding its market to 37 states and its production capacity to 340,000 barrels per year. By sales volume, Founders was the 30th largest U.S. craft brewery, and 41st largest U.S. brewery overall in 2012. By 2014, Founders had climbed to the 17th largest craft brewery and the 23rd largest overall. In 2014, Founders announced a $35 million expansion to double its production capacity and allow production of 900,000 barrels per year.

In December 2014, Founders announced that Spanish brewing company Mahou San Miguel had purchased a 30% minority stake in the business. A major-brewery stake of this size led the Brewers Association to no longer designate it as a "craft" brewery. In August 2019, the company announced that it was selling another 60% to Mahou; Stevens and Engbers, would each retain 5%, with other minority stakeholders bought out.

Beers
Founders produces several year-round packaged beers and a variety of seasonal and limited-production beers. Throughout the course of the year, Founders produces other beers sold on tap at their taprooms and beer festivals.

For several years, KBS (Kentucky Breakfast Stout) was highly sought-after during its annual release in April, but went to year-around production in 2020. It is an American Imperial Stout with a high ABV (11.2%), brewed with coffee and chocolate, and aged in bourbon barrels in nearby former gypsum mines. The "regular" Breakfast Stout is a formerly seasonal, now year-round, American Oatmeal Stout. CBS (Canadian Breakfast Stout) was released irregularly with gaps of years in between, and  Founders has no plans to brew it again.

Awards 
As of 2013, two of its beers, KBS (Kentucky Breakfast Stout) and CBS (Canadian Breakfast Stout), were ranked among BeerAdvocate's top 10 beers, with CBS ranked as the 4th best beer in the world by user review. In a 2013 poll, Ratebeer.com listed Founders as the 3rd best brewery in the world overall; Founders was 2nd place in 2011 and 2012. In April 2010, Founders won four medals at the World Beer Cup in Chicago, Illinois, and the brewery went on to win two more medals at Denver's Great American Beer Festival in September of that year. The brewery also won an award at the 2012 World Beer Cup in San Diego, California.

Taprooms
Founders operates taprooms in Grand Rapids and Detroit. The original taproom in Grand Rapids is adjacent to the brewing operations, and in addition to its retail brews, offers beers that are only available on tap. The 14,000-square-foot Detroit taproom opened in 2017. It primarily serves beers made in Grand Rapids, but also has a four-barrel brewing facility that can produce about eight kegs a week, allowing it to serve other beers as well.

Founders Fest
Each June, the company organizes a festival known as Founders Fest. The street in front of the brewery is closed down and blocked off for the event. National, regional, and local acts take the stage, and local food vendors and artists have booths. Each year more than 5,000 people attend the festival. Past acts have included Mustard Plug, Blues Traveler, Umphrey's McGee, Nahko and Medicine for the People, Soulive, Toubab Krewe, That 1 Guy, Galactic, Chicago AfroBeat Project, and The Crane Wives.

Controversies
Founders has had problems in some states with its labeling of beers. Until 2012, Dirty Bastard and Backwoods Bastard could not be sold in Alabama because of the name. In 2015, the label for Breakfast Stout, featuring a small child eating oatmeal, led to regulatory problems in Michigan and New Hampshire over the depiction of a child on an alcoholic beverage, requiring a temporary change in Michigan replacing the child with a note. 

In 2018, former employee Tracy Evans, who is African-American, sued Founders for racial discrimination, alleging that the company had allowed a hostile work environment, passed him over for a promotion in favor of less qualified white co-workers, and fired him for complaining about it. Founders issued a statement denying the allegations. In a sworn deposition leaked to the media in October 2019, his former manager Dominic Ryan stated that he could not definitively conclude whether Evans is black or not, a position Engbers disavowed. During the controversy, Founders pulled out of the 2019 Michigan Brewers Guild Detroit Fall Beer Festival. Ryan was terminated shortly after the leak, followed by Evans and Founders settling the dispute out of court.

See also
 Barrel-aged beer

References

External links
Company Website

Manufacturing companies based in Grand Rapids, Michigan
Beer brewing companies based in Michigan
1997 establishments in Michigan
Food and drink companies established in 1997